Coleophora lixella is a moth of the family Coleophoridae found in most of Europe. It was first described by Philipp Christoph Zeller in 1849.

Description
The wingspan is about 19 mm. Adults have a yellow ground colour with dusky-outlined whitish streaks. They are on wing from July to August. The head is white, the crown yellow tinged. Antennae whitish, basal 2/5 clothed with hairs, basal joint with strong tuft. Forewings with apex falcate; yellow; a subcostal streak to before middle, a discal streak from before middle to 2/3, a streak along fold, and several short streaks between veins towards costa posteriorly and termen silvery-white, blackish-edged. Hindwings dark grey.

Young larvae eat out the ripe fruit of a thyme (Thymus species) floret. The emptied and dried floret functions as the first case, in which hibernation takes place. After hibernation, the larva switches to grasses, initially in its original thyme case. Later, a new case is made out of a mined grass leaf. This case is about 11 mm long, two-valved, straw-coloured and has a mouth angle of about 25°. The case is a composite leaf case. Foodplants include meadow foxtail (Alopecurus pratensis),  sweet vernal grass (Anthoxanthum odoratum), downy oat-grass (Helictotrichon pubescens), common quaking grass (Briza media), soft brome (Bromus hordeaceus), cock's-foot (Dactylis glomerata), Elymus grasses, Yorkshire fog, (Holcus lanatus), Koeleria grasses and annual meadow grass (Poa annua). Larvae can be found from the end of August to the end of May.

References

lixella
Leaf miners
Moths described in 1849
Moths of Europe
Taxa named by Philipp Christoph Zeller